Persoonia acicularis is a species of flowering plant in the family Proteaceae and is endemic to the west coast of Western Australia. It is a shrub with linear, sharply-pointed leaves and yellow flowers in groups of up to eighty.

Description

Taxonomy and naming
Persoonia acicularis was first formally described in 1868 by Ferdinand von Mueller in his book Fragmenta Phytographiae Australiae from specimens collected by Augustus Frederick Oldfield near the Murchison River. The specific epithet, is derived from Latin and means "needle-shaped".

Distribution and habitat
This persoonia grows in heath in near-coastal areas of Western Australia between Shark Bay and the Arrowsmith River in the Geraldton Sandplains and Yalgoo bioigeographic regions.

Conservation status
Persoonia acicularis is classified as "not threatened" by the Government of Western Australia Department of Parks and Wildlife.

References

acicularis
Flora of Western Australia
Plants described in 1868
Taxa named by Ferdinand von Mueller